Gabriel Clark  D.D., was  an English Anglican priest in the 17th century.

Clark was  born in Hertfordshire and educated at Christ Church, Oxford. He held livings at Middleton Stoney and Elwick, County Durham. Clark was Archdeacon of Northumberland from 1619 to 1620 and Archdeacon of Durham until 1620 until his death on 10 May 1662.

Notes

People from Hertfordshire
17th-century English Anglican priests
Archdeacons of Northumberland
Archdeacons of Durham
Alumni of Christ Church, Oxford
1662 deaths
Year of birth missing